A small number of municipalities in Serbia held local elections in 2014. These were not part of the country's regular cycle of local elections but instead took place in certain jurisdictions where either the local government had fallen or the last local elections for four-year terms had taken place in 2010.

All local elections in 2014 were held under proportional representation. Mayors were not directly elected but were instead chosen by elected members of the local assemblies. Parties were required to cross a five per cent electoral threshold (of all votes, not only of valid votes), although this requirement was waived for parties representing national minority communities.

Results

Belgrade

2014 Belgrade City Assembly election

Vojvodina
No municipality in Vojvodina held local elections in 2014.

Šumadija and Western Serbia

Aranđelovac
An election was held in Aranđelovac on 16 March 2014, due to the expiry of the term of the previous assembly elected in 2010.

Incumbent mayor Bojan Radović of the Progressive Party was confirmed for another term in office after the election.

Lučani
An election was held in Lučani on 28 December 2014, with repeat voting in the village of Dučalovići on 5 January 2015. The Serbian government had previously established a provisional authority led by Slobodan Jolović on 23 October 2014, replacing the administration of outgoing Social Democratic Party mayor Mladomir Sretenović. Jolović was replaced later in the year by Miloś Velanac. Velanac in turn resigned in January 2015 and was very briefly replaced by Milivoje Dolović.

Vesna Stambolić of the Progressive Party was chosen as mayor in February 2015.

Mionica

Užice: Sevojno
The newly created municipality of Sevojno (in the city of Užice) had its inaugural local elections in 2014.

Brane Sindžirević of the Serbian Progressive Party was chosen as mayor after the election.

References

Local elections in Serbia
Loc